Gianni Di Giovanni (born July 3, 1963, in Potenza, Italy) is an Italian journalist. Since October 2020, has served as chairman of the board of directors of Eni China BV and as executive vice president of Eni's Beijing branch office.

Education and career 
Di Giovanni completed a degree in political science in 1986 at the Sapienza University of Rome. He then worked for the IRI for six years, before completing graduate studies in journalism at the Catholic University of Milan.

In 1994, he was appointed head of public relations at Stet International and head of Institutional Affairs at SMH and Stet International Netherlands, roles in which he served until 1998, when he became head of communications for Telecom Italia's TIM.

From November 2000 to December 2006, he served as head of public relations for the Italian mobile carrier Wind.

Di Giovanni was one of the early proponents of new media, as well as the relaunch of traditional media such as radio, spending 15 years working for telecoms across South America, Eastern Europe, India and China during major open market and privatisation processes in these regions.

From January 2006 to July 2013, he was Eni's executive vice president for public communications. During these years he coordinated the work of the company's communications representatives around the world.

In July 2012 he was appointed chairman of the Italian press agency AGI (Agenzia Giornalistica Italiana), a position which he held until his appointment as CEO of the agency in July 2013, when he was also appointed vice president of national press agencies at Fieg (the Italian federation of newspaper publishers).

While serving in the management of AGI, he helped strengthen the agency's internationalisation strategy and spur its growth in digital media. Both areas are now major strengths of AGI.

Since October 2015, Di Giovanni has served as chairman of the Board of Directors of Eni Co Inc.
He is also Chairman of the Board of Directors of Eni USA R&M Co. Inc., a company which produces and distributes lubricants in North America.

Since October 2015, he has served as executive vice chairman of Eni's Washington D.C. branch office.

Since October 2020, he has served as chairman of the board of directors of Eni China BV and as Executive Vice President of Eni's Beijing  branch office: a role through which he works to safeguard and promote Eni's interests in China, interfacing with local public institutions and authorities, assessing markets and advising the company on growth opportunities.

Since November 2017, he has served as board director of the Atlantic Council, an American think tank that promotes constructive leadership and engagement in international affairs based on the Atlantic Community's central role in meeting global challenges.

During 2018, he was awarded the executive master's degree in Climate Change and Energy: Policymaking for the Long Term at  Harvard University, The Kennedy School of Government.

He is the editor-in-chief of the platform ABO - About Oil and print magazine Oil, prestigious energy news publications, as well as the periodical Professione Gestore, a publication through which Eni communicates with managers throughout Italy, providing them with information on business strategy, promotional initiatives and new products.

Di Giovanni has authored two books: Niente di più facile, niente di più difficile - Manuale (pratico) per la comunicazion e, published in 2010 by Fausto Lupetti Editore, and La casa di vetro. Comunicare l'azienda nell'era digitale, published in 2013 by Rizzoli Etas.

He is a member of the faculty at the master programme in Media Relations and Communications at the Graduate School of Media Communication and Performing Arts at the Catholic University of Milan, as well as at the master programme in Digital Journalism at the Lateranense Postgraduate Centre – CLAS at the Pontifical Lateran University in Rome.

Publications 
Niente di più facile, niente di più difficile – Manuale (pratico) per la comunicazione

In 2010, Gianni Di Giovanni and Stefano Lucchini published Niente di più facile, niente di più difficile – Manuale (pratico) per la comunicazione through publisher Fausto Lupetti Editore. The book offers a practical guide to traditional and new media communication tools.

La casa di vetro. Comunicare l'azienda nell'era digitale

In 2013, the publishing house Rizzoli Etas published Di Giovanni and Lucchini's La casa di vetro. Comunicare l'azienda nell'era digitale. The book deals with how business communication has changed with the advent of the Internet and social media.

References

External links 
 Eni
 AGI

1963 births
Living people
Italian journalists
Italian male journalists
People from Potenza